Atomos (Greek undivided) may refer to:

 The Ancient Greek term for the ultimate particles of matter; see Atomic theory
 Atomos (album), a 2014 album by A Winged Victory for the Sullen
 Atomos (magician), a Cypriot magician who appeared in Antiquities of the Jews by Josephus
 Madame Atomos, a fictional villain in a series of novels by André Caroff
 8th Atomos, two EPs (2008 and 2009) by Seo Taiji
 Atomos (company), digital imaging

See also 
 Atomas, a game involving atoms by Sirnic
 Atom (disambiguation)